Rh-associated glycoprotein (RHAG) is an ammonia transporter protein that in humans is encoded by the RHAG gene. RHAG has also recently been designated CD241 (cluster of differentiation 241). Mutations in the RHAG gene can cause stomatocytosis.

Function 

The Rh blood group antigens (MIM 111700) are associated with human erythrocyte membrane proteins of approximately 30 kD, the so-called Rh30 polypeptides. Heterogeneously glycosylated membrane proteins of 50 and 45 kD, the Rh50 glycoproteins, are coprecipitated with the Rh30 polypeptides on immunoprecipitation with anti-Rh-specific mono- and polyclonal antibodies. The Rh antigens appear to exist as a multisubunit complex of CD47 (MIM 601028), LW (MIM 111250), glycophorin B (MIM 111740), and play a critical role in the Rh50 glycoprotein [supplied by OMIM].

Interactions 

RHAG has been shown to interact with ANK1.

See also 
 Rh deficiency syndrome

References

Further reading

External links 
 
 RhAG blood group system in the BGMUT blood group antigen gene mutation database

Clusters of differentiation
Solute carrier family
Blood antigen systems

Transfusion medicine